Vela Cunca (possibly from Aymara wila red, kunka throat, "red throat") is a mountain in the Carabaya mountain range in the Andes of Peru, about  high. It is located in the Puno Region, Carabaya Province, on the border of the districts Macusani and Ollachea. Vela Cunca lies northwest of the mountain Allincapac.

References

Mountains of Peru
Mountains of Puno Region